Operative vaginal delivery is a vaginal delivery that is assisted by the use of forceps or a vacuum extractor.

Operative vaginal delivery is a risk factor for PPH.

Indications 
Operative vaginal delivery is indicated in case of obstructed labour.

See also 
 Childbirth

References 

Obstetrical procedures
Midwifery
Human pregnancy